Robert Thomas Purkey (July 14, 1929 – March 16, 2008) was an American right-handed pitcher in Major League Baseball known for his use of the knuckleball. From 1954 through 1966, Purkey played for the Pittsburgh Pirates, Cincinnati Reds / Redlegs, and St. Louis Cardinals. In 1974 he was elected to the Cincinnati Reds Hall of Fame.

Pittsburgh Pirates
Born in Pittsburgh, Pennsylvania, Purkey signed with his hometown Pirates before the 1948 season. He reached the major leagues in 1954, but after 4 seasons in which he was used largely in relief, posting a combined record of 16-29, he was traded in December 1957 to the Cincinnati Reds for left-hander Don Gross.

Cincinnati Reds
Installed in the Red's starting rotation, Purkey enjoyed a great deal of success over the next seven seasons, peaking with a 23-5 season in 1962, finishing 8th in voting for the National League's Most Valuable Player Award. He had won 16 games with the Red's 1961 pennant winners, and was named to the NL All-Star team in 1958, 1961, and 1962, starting the second 1961 game. He started Game 3 of the 1961 World Series against the New York Yankees, and pitched a complete game but took the 3-2 loss after allowing solo home runs to Johnny Blanchard and Roger Maris in the 8th and 9th innings. He was one of eight pitchers used by the Reds in a 13-5 loss in Game 5, pitching the 5th and 6th innings and allowing two unearned runs, as the Yankees took the Series four games to one.

After his standout 1962 campaign, Purkey's record slipped to just 6-10 in 1963, and after finishing 11-9 in 1964 he was traded that December to the St. Louis Cardinals in exchange for Roger Craig and outfielder Charlie James.

St. Louis and Pittsburgh
Purkey alternated between starting and relieving in 1965, finishing the year with a 10-9 mark, and the Cardinals sold his contract to the Pirates a few days before the 1966 season began. He ended his career that season with 10 relief appearances for Pittsburgh before being released in August.

MLB career
Over a 13-season career, Purkey posted a 129-115 record with 793 strikeouts and an ERA of 3.79 in 386 appearances, including 276 starts, 92 complete games, 13 shutouts, 9 saves, and 2114 innings of work.

After baseball
Following his baseball career, Purkey worked as a sportscaster for KDKA-TV in Pittsburgh, then opened a successful insurance business.

Purkey died at the age of 78 in his hometown of Pittsburgh, Pennsylvania following a battle with Alzheimer's disease.

See also

 List of knuckleball pitchers

References

External links

Retrosheet
1961 World Series - Game 3 box score and play-by-play

1929 births
2008 deaths
Baseball players from Pittsburgh
Cincinnati Redlegs players
Cincinnati Reds players
Davenport Pirates players
Greenville Pirates players
Hollywood Stars players
Knuckleball pitchers
Major League Baseball pitchers
National League All-Stars
New Orleans Pelicans (baseball) players
Pittsburgh Pirates players
St. Louis Cardinals players